Vladimir Lvovich Ashurkov (born 15 February 1972) is a Russian political figure and the Executive Director of the Anti-Corruption Foundation. A former banker, Ashurkov was the Director of Group Portfolio Management and Control at Alfa Group Consortium from 2006 to 2012, when he was asked to step down due to his political involvement with Alexei Navalny. He was also on the board of the X5 Retail Group during this time.

In 2014, a panel of the Investigative Committee of Russia accused Ashurkov of embezzling funds from Alexei Navalny's 2013 Moscow mayoral campaign, after which he sought and was granted political asylum in the UK, claiming the allegations were politically motivated. Both Ashurkov and Navalny claim that the allegations are unfounded.

After relocating, Ashurkov organised bus tours for activists and journalists, similar to Roman Gul's "Kleptocrats Tour", "to show the tsarist opulence of the Russian oligarchy in London." He does this, says Ashurkov, according to the Stuttgarter Zeitung, to alert the British authorities to dirty money, as for example in Witanhurst owned by Andrey Guryev. Ashurkov advises the British government to dispense with the "dirty money", even though, according to Benjamin Plackett of Stuttgarter Zeitung, the "intertwining of Russian wealth with the British economy" complicates the policy.

Background
 Moscow Institute of Physics and Technology
 Wharton School of the University of Pennsylvania

References

External links
 

1972 births
Campaign managers
Independent politicians in Russia
Living people
Russian bloggers
Moscow Institute of Physics and Technology alumni
Russian emigrants to the United Kingdom
Russian physicists
Anti-Corruption Foundation
Russian businesspeople in the United Kingdom

Russian activists against the 2022 Russian invasion of Ukraine